R. Stefan Templeton (born July 15, 1967) is the founder of the SPEAR Project (Standing Patrol for Emergency Assessment and Response).

Of American and Norwegian descent, he is the grandson of the civil rights leader Dr. Furman L. Templeton. A linguist educated in Oxford and at the Sorbonne, Stefan Templeton studied shipbroking in 1990 while working as a structural weld inspector on oil platforms in the North Sea, having completed a rigorous training in deep-sea saturation diving in France, and went on to become an airborne search-and-rescue paramedic and disaster management specialist. He currently holds the rank of Commander in ELISA (Light Airborne Medical Rescue Squadron) based in Cruas, France and has led and co-ordinated civil-military operations most recently in Padang, Indonesia.

Stefan Templeton has conducted humanitarian missions around the globe when sudden onset natural disasters occur. He is currently the CEO of the Conceptium Group LLC, based in Washington D.C., which he founded in 1999 and specializes in procurement of infrastructure equipment for waterways projects in the Maghreb and West Africa. He is also the founder of Studio 2412.

In his youth, Templeton divided his time between the rough neighborhoods of Baltimore where he trained in the martial arts and aristocratic circles in Europe. Much of this was documented in David Matthews' auto-biography Ace of Spades. He is the grandson of Gerda Boyesen, the founder of Biodynamic Psychology. A holder of a multiple black belts, he also teaches safety and self-defense seminars to police forces, civic groups, humanitarian workers and NGOs on location.

Education 

National Professional Divers' Institute in Marseille

Downed-aircraft water rescue, firefighting and emergency medical training for divers at Scotland's Robert Gordon University

Royal Norwegian Shipping Academy

Disaster Management and Emergency Response Training at George Washington University and Johns Hopkins University.

ICRC certification course (providing potable water in large-scale humanitarian crises) at University of Neuchâtel, Switzerland.

Baltimore City College alumnus

Attended Mount Royal Elementary/Middle School #66

Humanitarian missions 

Templeton has acted as coordinator and civil-military forward field liaison in numerous airborne missions that he has organized in Honduras, Cambodia, Bosnia, Kashmir, Morocco, Indonesia and Colombia, specializing in rapid response deployment and assessment with the aim of paving the way for the relief efforts of military and civil humanitarian groups.

Ten days after the devastating tsunami that ensued due to the 2004 Indian Ocean earthquake, Templeton helped insert 27 medical personnel in Aceh Jaya (Indonesia) to conduct emergency assessment in the most inaccessible regions and coordinate delivery of supplies in collaboration with ELISA (Equipe Légere d'Intervention de Secours Aéroportée) and PFC (Paramedics for Children), with the support of Newmont Mining Corporation CEO Richard Ness. Templeton flew 24 surveillance and GPS mapping missions in order to provide geo-referenced intelligence to the UNJLC, thereby convincing them to use the Calang Camp as the relief distribution hub where the team then coordinated landing zones for USMC LCAT vessels delivering 30,000+ tons of supplies. Between January 5 and February 14, 2005, the team completed a pediatric vaccination campaign of 3,150 children.

In March 2007 and November 2007, in collaboration with the Kush Organization and the U.S. Institute of Peace, Templeton conducted missions in Abyei province in Southern Kordofan (Southern Sudan) to assess the situation in Agok, with special emphasis on analyzing water supply. He was accompanied by Charles O'Connell on both missions. An evacuation plan based on access to drinking water was set up in preparation for what seemed to be an imminent attack by Janjaweed forces. The mission was documented by freelance writer and photographer David Matthews who was writing a feature article for The Washington Post.

When Abyei Town was attacked and destroyed by SAF forces on May 14, 2008, the evacuation plan was implemented and in June 2008 Templeton helped lead 60,000+ refugees from Abyei to Agok.

See also 
 SPEAR Project
 ELISA (Light Airborne Medical Rescue Squadron)

References

External links 
  Bermuda Royal Gazette Feb. 26 2018
 Man with a Mission - Washington Post article
 National Public Radio - Interview on NPR
 Conceptium Trading Group LLC - Conceptium Trading Group LLC
 SPEAR Project - Standing Patrol for Emergency Assessment and Response
 Saving Tsunami Victims - First Responders to the Tsunami in Indonesia
 Sudan Arc Seminar - SPEAR field report on Abyei Survey
 Kush Organization - Art as Advocacy
 ELISA - Equipe Légere d'Intervention de Secours Aéroportée - French Light Airborne Rescue Squadron
 Paramedics for Children - Paramedics for Children
 USIP - U.S. Institute of Peace on Southern Sudan
 Ace of Spades - David Matthews' autobiography
 Draguage En Afrique - Infrastructure procurement for Francophone African waterway projects
 Dredge Supply - Infrastructure procurement for Anglophone African waterway projects
 Elmshorn Judo Club - Martial Arts Biography in German
 Martial Arts Background - List of instructors and credentials
 Multimedial und auf der Strasse gegen George W. Bush - German article in Heise about Studio 2412 and Conceptium Group

Paramedics
Alumni of the University of Oxford
University of Paris alumni
1967 births
Living people